Mutham ( Kiss) is a 2002 Indian Tamil-language slasher film directed by S. A. Chandrasekhar. The film stars Arun Vijay (known at the time as Arunkumar), Sathyan, Nagendra Prasad, Ajayan, Charulatha, Nanditha Jennifer and Anjali. The film, produced by M. Arul Moorthy, had musical score by Bharani and was released on 6 December 2002 to negative reviews.

Plot

Joseph (Ajayan) and Sudha (Anjali) get married against their parents' wishes and they elope with their friends' help. Sudha's father (Vincent Roy), a politician, wants to kill Sudha and her friends. They arrive at a beach resort where they meet an old man (Thalaivasal Vijay) who warns them about the dangers at the resort. He tells them that the place is haunted and murders can take place. The friends arrange for the couple's honeymoon, ignoring his pleadings to vacate the place. However, in the forest, all the friends get murdered one by one, it turns out that the old man was the one who committed these killings as he explains his flashback of his granddaughter getting killed in the name of sacrifice by unscrupulous businessmen for the sake of buying the forest where the resort has been built as for that he kills each and every person who visits this resort. In the end, the old man gets stabbed and Arun and his lover escape from the place being worried about the situation.

Cast

Production
The film was developed under the title Muthamidalaama and was touted as India's first digital film made for theatres. The film was shot for fifty days in forests across Tirupati, Hogenakkal Falls, Yelagiri hills and Alappuzha.

Soundtrack

The film score and the soundtrack were composed by Bharani. The soundtrack, released in 2002, features 6 tracks with lyrics written by Pa. Vijay, Snehan, Thamarai and Newton.

References

External links

2002 films
2000s Tamil-language films
Indian thriller films
Indian serial killer films
Indian slasher films
Films shot in Alappuzha
Films shot in Andhra Pradesh
Films shot in Tamil Nadu
Films directed by S. A. Chandrasekhar
2000s serial killer films
2000s slasher films
2002 thriller films